Gravitation (Serbo-Croatian: Gravitacija ili fantastična mladost činovnika Borisa Horvata; English: The Fantastic Youth of Bank Clerk Boris Horvat) is a 1968 Yugoslav film from Croatia directed by Branko Ivanda and starring Rade Šerbedžija.

References

External links
 
 Rupe u "Gravitaciji" 

1968 films
1960s Croatian-language films
Yugoslav drama films
Jadran Film films
Croatian black-and-white films
1968 directorial debut films
Croatian drama films